The Patthiram is one of the sub-sections of Arul Nool. The author of the content is unknown. But it was believed to be written down by Dharma Citar. This contains the rules and regulations for Citars. It is meant in the way that Ayya giving the acts to Dharma Citar. 

Ayyavazhi texts